The Rival Generals is a 1722 tragedy by the Irish writer James Sterling.

It premiered at the Smock Alley Theatre in Dublin. The original cast included Francis Elrington as Spinloi, Richard Elrington as Lorenzo, Henry Giffard as Honorio and Nancy Lyddal as Sygismunda.

Sterling dedicated his play to William Conolly, a leading Irish Whig and Speaker of the Irish House of Commons.

References

Bibliography
 Greene, John C. & Clark, Gladys L. H. The Dublin Stage, 1720-1745: A Calendar of Plays, Entertainments, and Afterpiece. Lehigh University Press, 1993.
 Walsh, Patrick. The Making of the Irish Protestant Ascendancy: The Life of William Conolly, 1662-1729. Boydell & Brewer, 2010.

1722 plays
Irish plays
Tragedy plays